Female Landscape, or Feminine Landscape, is an outdoor 1972 sculpture by Gerald Gladstone, installed in a fountain in the outdoor plaza of Montreal's Place Ville Marie complex, in Quebec, Canada.

See also

 1972 in art

References

External links
 

1972 establishments in Canada
1972 sculptures
Downtown Montreal
Fountains in Canada
Outdoor sculptures in Montreal
Sculptures of women in Canada